Olivier-Napoléon Drouin (1862–1934) was a Canadian politician, the mayor of Quebec City from 1910 to 1916. He also initiated the Rock City Tobacco company.

After representing Quebec City's Saint-Roch ward as alderman since 1896, Drouin won the 1910 mayoralty contest with a 1328 vote margin over his opponent, federal politician Philippe-Auguste Choquette. Drouin won re-election to successive terms in office in 1912 and 1914. During his terms as mayor, he oversaw the annexation of the communities of Belvedère, Limoilou and Saint-Malo to Quebec City.

After leaving the mayor's posting in 1916, Drouin chaired the Commission des chemins du Québec (Commission of routes of Quebec) between 1917 and 1922.

External links
  Commission de toponymie (Quebec): Drouin (canton)
  University of Sherbrooke, Bilan du Siècle: 1 mars 1910 - Élection de Olivier-Napoléon Drouin à la mairie de Québec
  University of Sherbrooke, Bilan du Siècle: Olivier-Napoléon Drouin (1862-1934) Homme politique, homme d'affaires

1867 births
1943 deaths
Mayors of Quebec City